Dietrich Graf von Hülsen-Haeseler (February 13, 1852 – November 14, 1908) was an infantry general of the German Empire.

He attended the War College and was attached to the German General Staff in 1882. In 1889 he was made aide de camp to Kaiser Wilhelm II, whom he had known since boyhood.

In 1894, von Hülsen-Haeseler was named military attaché at the German embassy in Vienna. In 1897, now a colonel, he returned to Berlin as commander of a guards regiment. In 1899 he was promoted to major general, made chief of general staff in the Guards Corps, and then given command of the 2nd Guards Infantry Brigade.

From May 1901 until his death in November 1908, von Hülsen-Haeseler served as Chief of the German Imperial Military Cabinet, during which time he rose to General of Infantry.

Death
On November 14, 1908, Dietrich Graf von Hülsen-Haeseler died of a heart attack while on a hunting trip in honor of the Kaiser. The hunting party was staying at Donaueschingen Castle in Donaueschingen, Baden-Württemberg; the Black Forest country estate of Prince Max von Furstenberg. During a formal evening function von Hülsen-Haeseler appeared dressed in the pink tutu and rose wreath of a ballerina, dancing for the Kaiser and his assembled guests. The performance included pirouettes, jumps, capers and flirtatious kisses to the audience. Apparently exhausted by his exertions the general bowed, collapsed and was pronounced dead after hasty medical attention. The circumstances were covered up by the officer corps so as not to further inflame public pressure over the homosexually themed Harden–Eulenburg affair. Ironically, it was von Hülsen-Haeseler who had organized the cover-up of that scandal.

Honours and awards 
German honours

Foreign honours

References

External links

 Justitias zweischneidiges Schwert - Magnus Hirschfeld als Gutachter in der Eulenburg-Affäre (in German)

1852 births
1908 deaths
Military personnel from Berlin
Prussian nobility
Generals of Infantry (Prussia)
Recipients of the Iron Cross, 2nd class
Grand Crosses of the Military Merit Order (Bavaria)
Grand Crosses of the Order of Franz Joseph
Grand Crosses of the Order of the Dannebrog
Knights Grand Cross of the Order of Saints Maurice and Lazarus
Recipients of the Order of the Crown (Italy)
Knights of the Order of the Netherlands Lion
Knights Grand Cross of the Order of Orange-Nassau
Recipients of the Order of the Medjidie, 1st class
Recipients of the Gold Imtiyaz Medal
Recipients of the Silver Imtiyaz Medal
Grand Crosses of the Order of Christ (Portugal)
Grand Crosses of Military Merit
Commanders of the Order of the Star of Romania
Grand Crosses of the Order of the Crown (Romania)
Recipients of the Order of St. Anna, 2nd class
Commanders Grand Cross of the Order of the Sword
Honorary Knights Grand Cross of the Royal Victorian Order